Kawalec is a Polish surname. Notable people with the surname include:

 Jacek Kawalec (born 1961), Polish actor
 Jerzy Kawalec, Polish guitarist
 Julian Kawalec, Polish writer
 Krzysztof Kawalec (born 1954), Polish historian
 Mieczysław Kawalec (1916-1951), Polish resistance fighter

See also
 

Polish-language surnames